is a Japanese actor.

Career
Graduating from Meiji Gakuin University, Yajima debuted as an actor in 1981. A frequent player in the films of Masato Harada, Yajima often plays yakuza and other bad guys, but can also do comic relief. He has appeared in over 200 TV dramas and 70 films.

Filmography

Film

Television

References

External links

1956 births
Living people
Male actors from Gifu Prefecture
Meiji Gakuin University alumni